The 2013 WNBA Playoffs is the postseason for the Women's National Basketball Association's 2013 season. Four teams from each of the league's two conferences will qualify for the playoffs, seeded 1 to 4 in a tournament bracket, with the two opening rounds in a best-of-three format, and the final in a best-of-five format.

The Minnesota Lynx won the 2013 WNBA Finals, sweeping the Atlanta Dream in three games. The Lynx became the second WNBA team to sweep through the playoffs since the WNBA adopted the best-of-five format for the finals. The Lynx defeated the Phoenix Mercury in the Western Conference Finals, and the Seattle Storm in the conference semifinals. The Mercury had reached the Finals by defeating the Los Angeles Sparks in three games.

The Atlanta Dream won the Eastern Conference sweeping the defending WNBA champion Indiana Fever in two games. The Dream had defeated the Washington Mystics in the conference semifinals. The Fever had reached the Eastern Conference Finals by upsetting the top-seeded Chicago Sky.

The Lynx won their third straight Western Conference Championship and second WNBA title in three years. The Dream, meanwhile, failed to win a title despite making their third trip to the finals in four years.

Tiebreak procedures

Two-team tie
 Better record in head-to-head games.
 Better winning percentage within own conference.
 Better winning percentage against all teams with .500 or better record at the end of the season.
 Better point differential in games head-to-head.
 Coin toss.

Three or more-team tie
 Better winning percentage among all head-to-head games involving tied teams.
 Better winning percentage against teams within conference (for first two rounds of playoffs) or better record against teams in the opposite conference (for Finals).
 Better winning percentage against all teams with a .500 or better record at the end of the season.
 Better point differential in games involving tied teams.
 Coin toss.

Playoff qualifying

Eastern Conference

Western Conference

Playoffs and Finals

Eastern Conference

Conference semifinals

(1) Chicago Sky vs. (4) Indiana Fever

Regular-season series
Indiana won the regular-season series 3–1:

(2) Atlanta Dream vs. (3) Washington Mystics

Regular-season series
Atlanta won the regular season series 3–2:

Conference finals

(2) Atlanta Dream vs. (4) Indiana Fever

Regular-season series
Atlanta won the regular season series 3–1:

Western Conference

Conference semifinals

(1) Minnesota Lynx vs. (4) Seattle Storm

Regular-season series
Minnesota won the regular season series 4–0:

(2) Los Angeles Sparks vs. (3) Phoenix Mercury

Regular-season series
Regular season series tied 2-2:

Conference finals

(1) Minnesota Lynx vs. (3) Phoenix Mercury

Regular-season series
Minnesota won the regular-season series 5-0:

WNBA Finals

Minnesota Lynx vs. Atlanta Dream

Regular Season Series
The season series was tied, 1-1:

References

External links
2013 WNBA Playoffs Official Site

Playoffs
Women's National Basketball Association Playoffs